Rajendra Ramesh Sapte is Shiv Sena Politician from Thane district, Maharashtra. He was the Deputy Mayor of Thane Municipal Corporation from 2014 to 2017. He had been elected to Thane Municipal Corporation for four consecutive terms from 1997 to 2012.

Positions held
 1997: Elected as corporator in Thane Municipal Corporation
 2002: Re-elected as corporator in Thane Municipal Corporation
 2007: Re-elected as corporator in Thane Municipal Corporation
 2012: Re-elected as corporator in Thane Municipal Corporation 
 2015: Elected as Deputy Mayor of Thane Municipal Corporation

References

External links
 Shivsena Home Page
 ठाणे महानगरपालिका पदाधिकारी

Living people
Marathi politicians
Maharashtra politicians
Shiv Sena politicians
People from Thane district
Year of birth missing (living people)